André-Charles Brottier (1751–1798), was a French royalist who sought the violent overthrow of the Directory.

He was born to wealthy parents in town of Tannay, Nièvre in 1751. He left the town following a fire which destroyed most of his father's property. In 1794 he was recruited into the "Paris Agency" - an organisation set up by Spanish ambassador, Fernan Nunes, to provide intelligence for his government. It was subsequently taken over by the Comte d'Antraigues.

References

1751 births
1798 deaths
People killed in the French Revolution
People from Nièvre
Royalist insurgents during the French Revolution